Carswell Grove Baptist Church and Cemetery, 1842–1846 Big Buckhead Church Road, near the hamlet of Perkins, Millen, Georgia (Jenkins County, Georgia) is a historic Black church and cemetery which are listed on the National Register of Historic Places in 1996. The church, a replacement for an earlier church burned in 1919, was destroyed by arson in 2014.

A different historic church, the Big Buckhead Baptist Church, is located a few hundred yards southwest. Prior to the Civil War blacks had worshipped there in segregated pews; after the war whites kicked out the blacks. White judge Porter W. Carswell gave blacks  nearby to build their own church; they named it in his honor.

The original church was burned in the Jenkins County, Georgia, riot of 1919. It was replaced in 1919 by a wood-frame clapboarded building with Gothic Revival windows and other details. Its front gable end was flanked by two square towers. Before its destruction in 2014, the building was boarded up and had deteriorated; the congregation meets in a more modest and modern adjacent building.

The cemetery was founded around 1870, when the original church building was built.  It is located along the rear and sides of the church, and includes "modest" headstones.

References

Further reading
 

Churches on the National Register of Historic Places in Georgia (U.S. state)
Gothic Revival architecture in Georgia (U.S. state)
Religious buildings and structures completed in 1870
National Register of Historic Places in Jenkins County, Georgia
Baptist churches in Georgia (U.S. state)
Buildings and structures in Jenkins County, Georgia
African-American churches
Arson in Georgia (U.S. state)
Attacks on African-American churches
Buildings and structures in the United States destroyed by arson